The Secretary of the Provincial Committee of the League of Communists of Vojvodina was the head of the League of Communists of Vojvodina, heading the Provincial Committee of the Party. The holder of the office was, for a significant period, the de facto most influential politician in the Socialist Autonomous Province of Vojvodina, an autonomous province of Serbia within Yugoslavia. The official name of the office was changed in April 1982 from "Secretary of the Provincial Committee" to President of the Presidency of the Provincial Committee of the League of Communists of Vojvodina (Predsednik Predsedništva Pokrajinskog komiteta Saveza komunista Vojvodine).

The League of Communists of Vojvodina was also an organization subordinate to the federal-level League of Communists of Yugoslavia and the republic-level League of Communists of Serbia. Between 1943 and September 1952, the former was named the Communist Party of Vojvodina (being part of the larger Communist Party of Yugoslavia), until both parties were renamed "League of Communists" in 1952.

List

Here follows a list of the fourteen officeholders:

See also
League of Communists of Vojvodina
League of Communists of Yugoslavia
Socialist Autonomous Province of Vojvodina
President of the Presidency of the Socialist Autonomous Province of Vojvodina
President of the Government of Vojvodina
President of the Assembly of Vojvodina
List of heads of state of Yugoslavia
Prime Minister of Yugoslavia
Politics of Vojvodina

References

Communism in Serbia